André Burakovsky (also stylized as Burakowsky; born 9 February 1995) is an Austrian-born Swedish professional ice hockey forward for the Seattle Kraken of the National Hockey League (NHL). He has previously played for the Washington Capitals, who drafted him 23rd overall in 2013, along with the Colorado Avalanche, who acquired his rights and consequently signed him during the 2019 offseason. Burakovsky is a two-time Stanley Cup champion, winning with the Capitals in 2018 and the Avalanche in 2022.

Playing career
Burakovsky was selected in the third round (102nd overall) by SKA Saint Petersburg in the 2012 KHL Junior Draft, and was selected by the Capitals in the first round (23rd overall) of the 2013 NHL Entry Draft.

Burakovsky made his professional debut during the 2011–12 season with the Malmö Redhawks of HockeyAllsvenskan when he was just 16 years old. He won a silver medal playing with Team Sweden at the 2012 IIHF World U18 Championships.

Washington Capitals

On 4 September 2013, Burakovsky signed a three-year entry-level contract with the Capitals. He then joined the Erie Otters of the Ontario Hockey League for the 2013–14 season.

Burakovsky scored his first NHL goal in his NHL debut on 9 October 2014, against Dustin Tokarski of the Montreal Canadiens. He became the second-fastest Capitals player to score their first career NHL goal, and the 13th Capitals player to score in his NHL debut. In 2015–16 he appeared in 79 games, scored 17 goals, and had 21 assists.

On 22 January 2017, against the Dallas Stars, Burakovsky scored the game's first goal for the fourth consecutive game, tying the NHL record for the most consecutive team games scoring the first goal. The last player to achieve this was Jonathan Cheechoo during the 2007–08 NHL season.

On 4 July 2017, he agreed to a 2-year, $6-million contract with the Washington Capitals. During the 2017–18 season, on 24 October 2017, Burakovsky required surgery on his thumb after it was injured in a game against the Florida Panthers and was expected to miss six to eight weeks. He returned to the Capitals lineup on 8 December 2017 after missing 20 games.

Burakovsky was sidelined with an injury during the 2018 Stanley Cup playoffs and missed the remainder of the Capitals first round against the Columbus Blue Jackets. After missing 10 playoff games, and going pointless upon returning, Burakovsky scored two goals in Game 7 against the Tampa Bay Lightning to help send the Capitals to the 2018 Stanley Cup Finals. He admitted to hiring a sports psychologist, saying, "I think when I'm doing something bad, I'm thinking about it for a long time, and it just sits in my head. That's something I have to work on in the summer." Despite his struggles, Burakovsky won the Stanley Cup with the Capitals on 7 June 2018.

Colorado Avalanche
On 28 June 2019, Burakovsky was traded to the Colorado Avalanche in exchange for Scott Kosmachuk and a second and third-round pick in 2020. On 15 July 2019, Burakovsky agreed to his qualifying offer, accepting a one-year, $3.25 million contract with the Avalanche. After attending his first training camp with Colorado, Burakovsky made his debut with the Avalanche in the opening game of the  season against the Calgary Flames on 3 October 2019, registering an assist. Relied to provide in an increased role from his tenure with the Capitals, Burakovsky responded by securing a role among the top six forwards, reaching the 20 goal mark for the first time in his career in placing third on the team in scoring with a career high 45 points through 58 regular season games. He collected a career-high four points (1 goal, 3 assists) in a game against the Buffalo Sabres on 4 February 2020. Missing 13 games through injury, Burakovsky returned from the COVID-19 pandemic pause in the playoffs to notch 7 goals and 17 points in only 15 post-season games. He notched two points in Game 7 of the Western Conference semi-finals, however was unable to help Colorado past the Dallas Stars.

On 10 October 2020, as a restricted free agent, Burakovsky was signed a two-year, $9.8 million contract extension with the Avalanche. In the pandemic delayed  season, Burakovsky continued in his second-line role primarily playing alongside Nazem Kadri and Brandon Saad. He made his 400th NHL appearance in a 3–2 victory over the Arizona Coyotes on 26 February 2021. He collected his 100th career goal on 10 May 2021, against the Vegas Golden Knights and finished the regular season with the Presidents' Trophy winning Avalanche, just one goal and one point short of his previous season totals with 19 goals and 44 points through 53 games. He was unable to replicate his previous playoff form with the Avalanche in the post-season, registering 1 goal and 4 points through 10 games in a second-round defeat to the Golden Knights.

On 12 December 2021, Burakovsky scored his first career hat trick in a game against the Florida Panthers at Ball Arena. In the 2022 Stanley Cup playoffs, the Avalanche swept the Nashville Predators in the first round, before beating the St. Louis Blues in the second round to advance to the Western Conference Final for the first time in twenty years. Burakovsky was scratched from two games in the second round series. They defeated the Edmonton Oilers in four games to advance to the 2022 Stanley Cup Finals, the second Cup Finals of Burakovsky's career, though he suffered an injury while shot-blocking that caused him to miss two games. Returning to the lineup for Game 1 of the Finals against the Tampa Bay Lightning, Burakovsky scored the game-winning goal in overtime, only his second of the playoffs to that point. He scored again in a 7–0 victory in Game 2, but sustained a broken thumb thereafter which held him out of the lineup as the Avalanche would become Stanley Cup champions, defeating the Lightning in six games.

Seattle Kraken
As a free agent following the conclusion of his contract with the Avalanche, on 13 July 2022, Burakovsky was signed to a lucrative five-year, $27.5 million contract with the Seattle Kraken.

Personal life
Burakovsky was born in Klagenfurt, in southern Austria where his father was playing hockey at the time, but grew up in Malmö, Sweden, his father's hometown. His father is Robert Burakovsky, who was drafted 217th overall 1985 NHL Entry Draft and played 23 games with the Ottawa Senators. His mother is Pernilla Burakovsky. He has two sisters, Alexandra Burakovsky and Anna Burakovsky. He is of Russian-Jewish descent.

Career statistics

Regular season and playoffs

International

Awards and honors

See also
List of select Jewish ice hockey players

References

External links
 

1995 births
Living people
Colorado Avalanche players
Erie Otters players
Hershey Bears players
Jewish ice hockey players
Malmö Redhawks players
National Hockey League first-round draft picks
Seattle Kraken players
Sportspeople from Klagenfurt
Stanley Cup champions
Swedish ice hockey left wingers
Swedish people of Russian descent
Swedish people of Russian-Jewish descent
Washington Capitals draft picks
Washington Capitals players